Blechreiz is a German ska band founded in 1983 in southern Berlin.
Along with Skaos from Bavarian Krumbach, No Sports, The Braces from Jülich, El Bosso & die Ping-Pongs from Munster and The Busters from Wiesloch, Blechreiz was one of the pioneers of the German ska scene at the end of the 1980s and the beginning of the 1990s. The band mostly plays songs it writes and arranges itself. A number of changes in the lineup has meant that Blechreiz’s style has varied over the years. Blechreiz allies itself with anti-racist and anti-fascist skinheads such as Skinheads Against Racial Prejudice (SHARP).

History
In summer 1989, Blechreiz planned a joint tour of the still-securely-walled-in GDR with Michele Baresi, then the only ska band in East Berlin. Although the tour was initially a victim of pre-reunification administrative chaos, it took place when the wall came down in the spring of 1990. Many of the concert venues Blechreiz played in had never before hosted a band from the West. In the next few years, many concerts and tours in Germany and guest appearances in France, London, northern Italy, Belgium, Austria and Poland built the band and its stage show’s reputation.

In 1993, Berlin’s concertgoers picked Blechreiz as the Best Live Band in Berlin. A concert featuring many guest stars in the Tempodrom concert hall in Berlin generated acclaim from the press.
Together with ‘volxmusic’ band Apparatschik, Blechreiz initiated the SKASDROWJE project in 1994. As a big band formation, they played Russian folk music in ska rhythm at a variety of festivals. In 1995, Blechreiz was featured in TV film „Which Side Are You On – Ska in Berlin“.  It contained film portraits of ska bands Blechreiz West-Berlin) and Michele Baresi.

1996 saw the band's farewell tour in Germany. Their last concert was held in SO36 in Berlin Kreuzberg. Blechreiz reformed in its original lineup in 2008. The kick-off concert was held in the Red Salon in Berlin Mitte on 29 February 2008. Since then, the band has recorded one new album and played gigs in various places in Germany and in the Czech Republic.

Discography

Albums 
 1988: Out Tonight (Tape-Recording/Blechreiz)
 1990: Who Napped JB (Rude Records)
 1991: Who Napped JB – CD inkl. Bonus Tracks (Rude Records)
 1993: Which Side Are You On? (Traumton / Zensor)
 1994: Rude Gangsters – LP-CD (Traumton / Zensor)
 1995: Schnaps oder Suppe – Live-LP-CD (Traumton / Zensor)
 2009: Those were are the Days – Live-CD (Blechreiz)

EPs
 1993: Loving Couple – EP-CD (Traumton / Zensor)
 1994: Rude Gangsters – EP-CD (Traumton / Zensor)
 1996: Die Jungs sind wieder da – EP-CD (Blechreiz)

Filmography
 „Out Tonight“ – Video-clip (Adrian)
 „Winner Of Senats-Rockwettbewerb“ – Live video
 „Live im KOB“ – 10-minute-feature (Fishfinger-Productions)
 „1199“ – Guest appearance on former GDR television
 “Ska in Berlin” – ORB (Ostdeutscher Rundfunk Brandenburg television station) – Report on Blechreiz’s 10th anniversary
 „Berlin-Warzawa“ –  Live video of the Friendship Concert in Warsaw, Poland filmed by Polish TV 1 television station
 „Which Side Are You On?“ – Television documentary (Arte/Yildiz Film)

References

 Fortsetzung der Ostpolitik mit anderen Rhythmen? Rock goes Kriegsgräberfürsorge. Ein Bericht aus Warschau von Andreas Becker (taz, die tageszeitung (Berlin), 11.9.1993, page 17
 Olympia: Berlin feiert zweimal, 23.9.1993, (taz, die tageszeitung (Berlin), page 20
 Deutsche Lektionen. Pork Pie feiert sein zehnjähriges Jubiläum. Von Thomas Winkler, taz, die tageszeitung (Berlin), 26.6.1999, page 24

External links
 Official website
 Ska - Der Musikstil der Arbeiter, 12.11.2009, newspoint
 Punker feierten ihre größte Acker-Party, 03.08.2009, Ostsee-Zeitung
 Edelmetall rostet nicht. „Blechreiz“-Debüt beim 19. Skafestival, 10.07.2009, Märkische Allgemeine

German ska groups